John Ryan Davey (20 September 1913 – 6 September 1992) was an Australian cricketer. He played five first-class matches for South Australia between 1933 and 1935.

See also
 List of South Australian representative cricketers

References

External links
 

1913 births
1992 deaths
Australian cricketers
South Australia cricketers
People from Broken Hill, New South Wales
Cricketers from New South Wales